Maros Regency is a regency of South Sulawesi province of Indonesia. It covers an area of 1,619.12 sq.km, and had a population of 319,002 at the 2010 Census and 391,774 at the Census of 2020. The official estimate for mid 2021 was 396,924. Almost all of the regency lies within the official metropolitan area of the city of Makassar. The capital town of the regency is Maros.

Administrative division 
The Regency is divided into fourteen districts, tabulated below with their areas and population totals from the 2010 Census and the 2020 Census, together with the official estimate as at mid 2021. The table also includes the number of administrative villages (rural desa and urban kelurahan) in each district, and its postal codes.

Twelve of the fourteen districts tabulated above lie within the official metropolitan area of the city of Makassar; the remaining two districts (Camba and Mallawa), which together form the northeast salient of the regency (with just 6.86% of the regency's population in 2021), lie outside the metropolitan area.

Rock art in Maros

Important examples of rock art exist in the Maros regency.  At the Leang Petta Kere cave for example, in the Bantimurung district (kecamatan) about 30 km to the north of Makassar, there are a number of red-and-white hand prints of animals and hands.   The images were made by blowing red pigment around hands that were pressed on the surface of the rocks. These handprints are often accompanied by fruit-eating, pig-deer looking animals called babirusas. A total of 12 images were found on the walls of seven different caves in the area. The sites have been submitted to the UNESCO World Heritage Tentative list for possible inclusion.

The main site of the rock art is in seven caves around 40–60 km north east of Makassar.  The oldest is a hand stencil located in Timpuseng cave with an estimated age of over 39,000 years. It is accompanied by a depiction of a female babirusa, from about 35,000 years ago. The panel where the art can be found is located 4 meters above the cave floor and 8 meters from the entrance.

The rock art in the caves was originally discovered in the 1950s by a Dutch archaeologist, H. R. van Heekeren, but at the time, was not regarded as being especially significant. More recently, analysis of the pictures by an Australian-Indonesian team suggests that a number of the markings are over 30,000 years old.  They were looking at mineral layers that were covering the images, and tracing the amount of radioactive uranium in them. This technique did not give an exact date, but it narrowed down the time when the images were possibly painted. The work suggests that early settlers in Asia were creating their own artwork at the same time, or even earlier, than artwork of this kind was being created in Europe.

The caves were of interest to the British naturalist Alfred Russel Wallace.  Wallace visited the East Indies during the period 1854 to 1862 although he appears not to have spotted the artwork.  Wallace discusses his visit to the region in his well-known book The Malay Archipelago first published in 1869.

Journal Science announced that hand print in Maros Cave by mouth spraying dye is in the sixth position of the 2014’s top ten science breakthroughs and is called as Indonesian Cave Art. The art of drawing in (Maros Cave) rocks has same old with inhabitant of the European land.

Natural features

Maros Regency is famous for its karst hills and cliffs which have been referred to as "The Spectacular Karst Towers".

The Karaenta Nature Reserve, best known for the Moor macaque monkeys (Macaca maura) in the park, is located in the Cenrana district (kecamatan) in the regency.  Moor macaques are endemic to Sulawesi and are considered to be endangered because the remaining numbers are believed to be limited.

Caves

The longest known cave in Indonesia is the Salukangkallang cave (27-kilometer in length). The cave is mostly in the Samangki Village Tourist Area (Kawasan Desa Wisata Samangki), but the entrance to the cave is in Labuaja village, nearby to Samangki village.

References

Regencies of South Sulawesi
Archaeological sites in Indonesia
World Heritage Sites in Indonesia
Prehistoric Indonesia